Chinese hamster ovary (CHO) cells are an epithelial cell line derived from the ovary of the Chinese hamster, often used in biological and medical research and commercially in the production of recombinant therapeutic proteins. They have found wide use in studies of genetics, toxicity screening, nutrition and gene expression, particularly to express recombinant proteins. CHO cells are the most commonly used mammalian hosts for industrial production of recombinant protein therapeutics.

History
Chinese hamsters had been used in research since 1919, where they were used in place of mice for typing pneumococci. They were subsequently found to be excellent vectors for transmission of kala-azar (visceral leishmaniasis), facilitating Leishmania research.

In 1948, the Chinese hamster was first used in the United States for breeding in research laboratories. In 1957, Theodore T. Puck obtained a female Chinese hamster from Dr. George Yerganian's laboratory at the Boston Cancer Research Foundation and used it to derive the original Chinese hamster ovary (CHO) cell line. Since then, CHO cells have been a cell line of choice because of their rapid growth in suspension culture and high protein production.

Having a very low chromosome number (2n=22) for a mammal, the Chinese hamster is also a good model for radiation cytogenetics and tissue culture.

Properties
All CHO cell lines are deficient in proline synthesis. Also, CHO cells do not express the epidermal growth factor receptor (EGFR), which makes them ideal in the investigation of various EGFR mutations.

Furthermore, Chinese hamster ovary cells are able to produce proteins with complex glycosylations, post-translational modifications (PTMs) similar to those produced in humans. They are easily growable in large-scale cultures and have great viability, which is why they are ideal for GMP protein production. Also, CHO cells are tolerant to variations in parameters, be it oxygen levels, pH-value, temperature or cell density.

Variants
Since the original CHO cell line was described in 1956, many variants of the cell line have been developed for various purposes. In 1957, CHO-K1 was generated from a single clone of CHO cells. Variants of K1 include the deposits in ATCC, ECACC, and a version adated for growth in protein-free medium.

CHO-K1 was mutagenized in the 1970s with ethyl methanesulfonate to generate a cell line lacking  dihydrofolate reductase (DHFR) activity, referred to as CHO-DXB11 (also referred to as CHO-DUKX). However, these cells, when mutagenized, could revert to DHFR activity, making their utility for research somewhat limited. Subsequently in 1983, CHO cells were mutagenized with gamma radiation to yield a cell line in which both alleles of the DHFR locus were completely eliminated, termed CHO-DG44. These DHFR-deficient strains require glycine, hypoxanthine, and thymidine for growth. Cell lines with mutated DHFR are useful for genetic manipulation as cells transfected with a gene of interest along with a functional copy of the DHFR gene can easily be screened for in thymidine-lacking media. Due to this, CHO cells lacking DHFR are the most widely used CHO cells for industrial protein production.

More recently, other selection systems have become popular and with vector systems that can more efficiently target active chromatin in CHO cells, antibiotic selection (puromycin) can be used as well to generate recombinant cells expressing proteins at high level. This sort of system requires no special mutation, so that non-DHFR-deficient host cell culture have been found to produce excellent levels of proteins.

Since CHO cells have a very high propensity of genetic instability (like all immortalised cells) one should not assume that the names applied indicate their usefulness for manufacturing purposes. For example, the three K1 offspring cultures available in 2013 each have significant accumulated mutations compared to each other. Most, if not all industrially used CHO cell lines are now cultivated in animal component free media or in chemically defined media, and are used in large scale bioreactors under suspension culture. The complex genetics of CHO cells and the issues concerning clonal derivation of cell population was extensively discussed.

Genetic manipulation
Much of the genetic manipulation done in CHO cells is done in cells lacking DHFR enzyme. This genetic selection scheme remains one of the standard methods to establish transfected CHO cell lines for the production of recombinant therapeutic proteins. The process begins with the molecular cloning of the gene of interest and the DHFR gene into a single mammalian expression system.  The plasmid DNA carrying the two genes is then transfected into cells, and the cells are grown under selective conditions in a thymidine-lacking medium.  Surviving cells will have the exogenous DHFR gene along with the gene of interest integrated in its genome. The growth rate and the level of recombinant protein production of each cell line varies widely. To obtain a few stably transfected cell lines with the desired phenotypic characteristics, evaluating several hundred candidate cell lines may be necessary.

The CHO and CHO-K1 cell lines can be obtained from a number of biological resource centres such as the European Collection of Cell Cultures, which is part of the Health Protection Agency Culture Collections. These organizations also maintain data, such as growth curves, timelapse videos of growth, images, and subculture routine information.

Industrial use
CHO cells are the most common mammalian cell line used for mass production of therapeutic proteins. They can produce recombinant protein on the scale of 3-10 grams per liter of culture. Products of CHO cells are suitable for human applications, as they allow post-translational modifications to recombinant proteins which can function in humans.

See also 

Cell culture
Drug development
Preclinical development

References

External links
Chinese Hamster Genome Database
 Recombinant Protein Therapeutics from CHO Cells — 20 Years and Counting

Cellosaurus entry for CHO
Cellosaurus entry for CHO-K1
Cellosaurus entry for CHO-DG44
Cellosaurus entry for CHO-DXB11

Rodent cell lines